The 2010–11 Austrian Cup was the 77th season of Austria's nationwide football cup competition. It commenced with the matches of the preliminary round in July 2010 and concluded with the Final on 29 May 2011. The winners of the competition qualified for the third qualifying round of the 2011–12 UEFA Europa League.

Preliminary round
The Preliminary Round involved 68 amateur clubs from all regional federations, divided into smaller groups according to the Austrian federal states. The draw for this round was conducted in Vienna on 7 July 2010. After the draw, SV Bad Aussee had to withdraw from the competition after going into administration, earning their opponents USV Allerheiligen a walkover. The remaining thirty-three matches were played between mid-July and 1 August 2009, with the winners of these matches advancing to the first round.

|-
|colspan="3" style="background-color:#fcc;"|

|-
|colspan="3" style="background-color:#fcc;"|

|-
|colspan="3" style="background-color:#fcc;"|

|-
|colspan="3" style="background-color:#fcc;"|

|-
|colspan="3" style="background-color:#fcc;"|

|-
|colspan="3" style="background-color:#fcc;"|

|-
|colspan="3" style="background-color:#fcc;"|

|}

First round
The draw for this round was conducted on 3 August 2010. The draw involved the 34 winners of the preliminary round, the 20 professional teams from the 2010–11 Bundesliga and First League, SC-ESV Parndorf 1919 as losing team of the 2009–10 Regionalliga promotion play-offs and nine regional cup winners. The matches of this round were played between 12 and 17 August 2010.

|-
|colspan="3" style="background-color:#fcc;"|

|-
|colspan="3" style="background-color:#fcc;"|

|-
|colspan="3" style="background-color:#fcc;"|

|-
|colspan="3" style="background-color:#fcc;"|

|-
|colspan="3" style="background-color:#fcc;"|

|}

Second round
The draw for this round was conducted on 18 August 2010. The draw involved the 32 winners of the first round. The matches of this round were played on 16–18 September 2010.

|-
|colspan="3" style="background-color:#fcc;"|

|-
|colspan="3" style="background-color:#fcc;"|

|-
|colspan="3" style="background-color:#fcc;"|

|-
|colspan="3" style="background-color:#fcc;"|

|-
|colspan="3" style="background-color:#fcc;"|

|}

Third round

The 16 winners from the previous round competed in this stage of the competition.

|-
|colspan="3" style="background-color:#fcc;"|

|-
|colspan="3" style="background-color:#fcc;"|

|}

Quarter-finals

Semi-finals

Final

See also
 2010–11 Bundesliga
 2010–11 First League

External links

 Official website 
 Austriasoccer.at page

References

Austrian Cup seasons
Cup
Austrian Cup